List of works published by Shueisha, including manga, light novels, etc., listed by release date.

1950s

1956
Lion Books

1958
KuriKuri Tōshu
KuriKuri Tōshu: Puro Yakyū Hen
Red Mask
Tama Kyūrō-san

1959
Blue Jet
Dangan Tantei
Hen Maboroshi Mikaduki Maru
Himalayan Tenhei
Kondoru Tani no Himitsu
Maboroshi Zukin
Mei Inu Tiger
Shō-tsubu Tengu
Shōnen Flash
Shōnen Hawk
Switch-kun

1960s

1960
20 Seiki no Hīrō
Akai Alpha
CQ! Pet 21
Dokugan Ryū Sanjō
Hashire! Shiro Bai
Kappa Senpūji
Kaitei Sentai
Kuramatengu
Mei Inu Rex
Meiba Flicker
Nekketsu Kakutasu
Ōgon Kujaku Shiro
Rawhide
Shinsetsu Mitokōmon
Shōnen No. 1
Shutter Kozō
Susume! Donguri
Tenka Taihei
Zero no Himitsu

1961
Hagetan Hōrōki
Judo Boy
Jungle no Ōja
Kuroi Ōkami
Kyū-chan Ikka
Mammoth Boy
Ninja Shiro
Nippon Shōnen
Odekono-san Tarō

1962
Dai-3 no Otoko
Fighter Takeshi
George George
Kuroi Kōya
Thunder Boy
Yaji uma Kozō

1963
Attama Shachō
Big X
Chikyū Taisen-tai
Chi no Ninja
Fūunji-ken
Hinomaru-kun
Keirei! Shinpei-kun
Marē Byakko-tai
Moero Minami Jūjisei
Ō-kun
Shinobi Yarō
Shinsengumi
Shōnen Rocket Butai
Taihei Haraji
Tatsu Chinkun
Zero Zero Shirei

1964
Can-tarō
Daisuke 100-dan
Nippon Kessaku Sentōki Series
Saikoro Korojo
Sanada Tsurugi Ryū (Dai 2 Bu)
Sarutobi Ecchan
Shinobi Ōkami Hayate
Shōnen Giants
Space Ace
Tekinaka Toppa
Terebi Kozō Teresuke
Tonneru-kun
Yokoyama Kōki no Manga Kyōshitsu

1965
Fight Kyōdai
Fūma
Jiro Kichi
Jungle King
Kon Taira-tō
Nandemo Yarō Akatsuka-kun
Uchū-sen Red Shāku
Umi no Ōji Tantan

1966
Honey Honey no Suteki na Bouken
Kaitō ½ Mensō
Kenedeī Kishidan
Kizō Tengai
Jungle Prince
Sally the Witch
Speed Racer
Skyers 5
Tenteko Manyūki
Yūsei Kamen

1967
1·2 Sakusen
Chibi Futo-kun
Chikyū 1 Oku 3-Nen
Chintara Kami-chan
Donkkinko
Ganbare Shōnen Giants
Ganbari Mashō
Obake no Q-Tarō
Princess Comet

1968
Attack No. 1
Captain Scarlet
Chichi no Tamashii
Grand Dolls
Grand Prix Yarō
Harenchi Gakuen
Kaikidai Sakusen
Kōsoku ESP
Kujira Daigo
Life for Sale
Manga Konto 55-go
Ninja Hattori-kun
Ninja Taikōki, Sengoku No. 1
Ore wa Kamikaze
Otoko Ippiki Gaki-Daishō
Otoko no Jōken
Ryūsei Kyūdan
Vampire (Dai 2 Bu)

1969
Dorobō Gakuen
Kakumeiji Gebara
Manga Daigaku
Okusama wa 18-sai

1970s

1970
1970 Tagiri
Aitsu!
Akage no Ōkami
Animal Kyūjō
Ankoku Rettō
Akuma-kun
Arashi! San-biki
Asu wa Tsukameru ka
Black Pro Fighter Takeru
Gen'yaku Seisho
Guts 4
Inochi Girigiri
Jinsei Nishō Ippai
Jumbo Yarō
Kajiko
Kasane
Keppare! Ōta-Tōshu
Kirisakareta Seishun
Kyūsoku 0.25-Byō!
Manga Drifters
Namida no Gyakuten Homer
Nanamaru-Shiki Sentōki
Nusutto
Okinawa
Ore wa Kebatetsu!
Sennen Ōkoku
Siberia no Kiba
The Gutsy Frog
Toilet Hakase
Totsugeki Rāmen
Wakai Arashi
Worst
Yoake no Tategami

1971
4 Tarō 1 Hime
Bara no Sakamichi
Bijomaru
Black Eagle
Good-Bye
Guzuroku Kōshinkyoku
Head! Kiba
Ikari no Mound
Japash
Key Girl
Kōya no Shōnen Isamu
Lion Books II
Nekketsu-dan
Ningen no Jōken
ProWres Sōsamō
Samurai Giants
Seishun Saizensen
Shiroi Heya no Futari
V no Kuchibue
Yami no Senshi
Zūzūshī Yatsu

1972
Akukamen
Astro Kyūdan
Boku no Dōbutsuen Nikki Ueno Dōbutsuen • Nishiyama Toshio Hanseiki
Captain
Hop Step
I Saw It
Kuso Bōzu Guntetsu
Lady Snowblood
Mazinger Z
Moete Hashire!
Musashi
Mysterious
Ore wa Ryū
Renshō Yarō
Shōnen no Kuni
Sore Ike Jump de Young Oh! Oh!
Spike No. 1
The Kicker
The Rose of Versailles

1973
Aim for the Ace!
Barefoot Gen
Climb Sweeper
Dream Kamen
Hai ni Naru Shōnen
Hōchōnin Ajihei
Onikko
Onna Darake
Outer Lek
Ōbora Ichidai
Play Ball
Sora no Shiro
Taiyō no Shima
Wagahai wa Norakō

1974
Dohazure Tenkaichi
Goronbo Isha
Honō no Kyojin
Kaze! Hana! Tatsu!
Moero! Benten
Pink! Punch! Miyabi
Sukeban Arashi
Tomodachi Gakuen
Yōkai Hunter

1975
1•2 no Ahho!!
Circuit no Ōkami
Dear Brother
Doberman Deka
Edokko Tatchan
Gakuen Yorozuya
Hana mo Arashi mo
Kawaii Gambler
Shin Attack No. 1
The Window of Orpheus
Tora no Racer
Yūjō Gakuen
Zero no Shirataka

1976
Akutare Kyojin
Ankoku Shinwa
Beranmē Holmes
Boronbo-sensei
Blue City
Condor no Tsubasa
Cyborg 009
Hoankan Jō
Hokuto no Kishi
Jitsuroku Kyojin-gun Monogatari
Kochira Katsushika-ku Kameari Kōen-mae Hashutsujo
Neppū no Tora
Onsen Boy
ProWres tai Jūdō
Satellite no Niji
Shiroi Senshi Yamato
Swan
Tōdai Itchokusen
Yon-chōme no Kaijin-kun

1977
Asatarō-den
Big 1
Hole in One
Jambo de Gomennasutte
Jump Minwa Gekijō
Kaiki Manatsu no Yawa
Kōshi Ankoku Den
Kyojin-tachi no Densetsu
Ring ni Kakero
Shiroi Karyūdo
Susume!! Pirates
U.F.O.-gari
Yami no Tōbōi
Yatchin
Yūkari no Ki no Moto de

1978
Bikubiku Nyanko
Claudine
Cobra
Kaitei Poseidon
Karate Inochi
Kazoku Dōbutsuen
Keisatsuken Monogatari Keishichō • Kanshikika Amano Shigeo Funtōki
Mikoto
Pinboke Shatta
Rock 'n Roll Baseball
Ruse! Ruse!!
Sawayaka Mantarō
Watari Kyōshi
Wonder Island

1979
Appare Ikka
Gō Shūto Seishun Nikki Go☆Shoot
Futari no Derby
Hanappe Bazooka
Igano Kabamaru
Kinnikuman
Mannen'yuki no Mieru Ie
Massugu ga Iku
Nekkyū Suikoden
Ohayō Mimi-chan
Rajikon Sensō
Sasurai Kishidō
Shiritsu Kiwamemichi Kōkō
Sky Eagle
Studio Help
Tennis Boy
Tomato, Girl Detective
Wonder Island 2
Yasei no Bible

1980s

1980
Dr. Slump
Third Year Funny-face Club

1981
Captain Tsubasa
Cat's Eye
Pola & Roid
Stop!! Hibari-kun!

1982
Fūma no Kojirō
Hetappi Manga Kenkyūjo
High School! Kimengumi
Tatakae!! Ramenman
Mad Matic
Tokimeki Tonight
Yūkan Club

1983
Akira Toriyama's Manga Theater
Chobit
Chobit 2
Fist of the North Star
Silver Fang -The Shooting Star Gin-
The Rose of Versailles: Gaiden
Wing-Man

1984
Baoh
Captain Tsubasa Boku wa Misaki Taro
Dragon Ball
Eiji

1985
Blood Reign: Curse of the Yoma
City Hunter
Sakigake!! Otokojuku
Tsuide ni Tonchinkan

1986
Chibi Maruko-chan
Saint Seiya

1987
Jōhō Chishiki Imidas
JoJo's Bizarre Adventure Part 1: Phantom Blood
JoJo's Bizarre Adventure Part 2: Battle Tendency
Papa Told Me
The Burning Wild Man

1988
Bastard!!
Handsome na Kanojo
Hen
Riki-Oh
Rokudenashi Blues
Shōnen Ashibe

1989
Chameleon Jail
Circuit no Ōkami II: Modena no Tsurugi
Dragon Quest: The Adventure of Dai
JoJo's Bizarre Adventure Part 3: Stardust Crusaders
Ten de Shōwaru Cupid

1990s

1990
Akira Toriyama: The World
Akira Toriyama: The World Special
Amai Seikatsu
Battle Angel Alita
Futaba-kun Change!
Slam Dunk
YuYu Hakusho

1991
Akazukin Chacha
Tenshi Nanka Ja Nai

1992
Angel Densetsu
Boys Over Flowers
Golden Boy
Hareluya II Boy
JoJo's Bizarre Adventure Part 4: Diamond Is Unbreakable
JoJo's Bizarre Adventure Volume 1: Meet Jotaro Kujo
JoJo's Bizarre Adventure Volume 2: The Death of Avdol
Shadow Lady (V-Jump)
Zenki

1993
Anata to Scandal
The Brief Return of Dr. Slump
Captain Tsubasa: Saikyo no teki: Holland Youth
Go! Go! Ackman
JoJo's Bizarre Adventure (novel)
JoJo's Bizarre Adventure Volume 3: The World of Dio
JoJo6251
The World of Akira Toriyama: Akira Toriyama Exhibition
Tottemo! Luckyman
TOUGH: High School Iron Fist Legend

1994
A Gentle Breeze in the Village
Bomber Girl
Captain Tsubasa: "World Youth" Saga
Rurouni Kenshin
Salary Man Kintaro
Steam Detectives
Zetman (One-shot)

1995
Ashen Victor
Baby Love
Demon Fighter Kocho
Dragon Ball Daizenshu: The Complete Illustrations
Sexy Commando Gaiden
Shadow Lady (One-shot)
Shadow Lady (Weekly Shōnen Jump)
Sora Yori Takaku

1996
Buzzer Beater
Dragon Quest Monsters: Akira Toriyama Illustrations
JoJo's Bizarre Adventure Part 5: Golden Wind
Rurouni Kenshin Profiles
Samurai Gun
Yu-Gi-Oh!

1997
Agharta
Barairo no Ashita
Butsu Zone
Buzzer Beater
Clover
Colorful
Cowa!
Naruto
Seikimatsu Leader den Takeshi!
Sing "Yesterday" for Me
Tenjho Tenge
Thus Spoke Kishibe Rohan

1998
Alichino
Aqua Knight
Crown of Love
Double House
Fancy Lala
Gals!
Rookies
Shaman King
Short-Tempered Melancholic
The First President of Japan
Theatrical & TV Anime Yu-Gi-Oh! Super Complete Book
Ultimate Muscle: The Kinnikuman Legacy
Whistle!

1999
Gorgeous Carat
Hikaru no Go
Kenshin Kaden
Real
Sadamitsu the Destroyer
St. Dragon Girl
The Devil Does Exist
Yu-Gi-Oh! (Novel)
Yu-Gi-Oh! Official Card Game Duel Monsters Official Card Catalog The Valuable Book
Zombiepowder.

2000s

2000
Animal Yokochō
Arcana
Battle Angel Alita: Last Order
Black Cat
Captain Tsubasa Millennium Dream
Gag Manga Biyori
Gantz
Happy World!
JoJo A-Go! Go!
JoJo's Bizarre Adventure Part 6: Stone Ocean
Parfait Tic!
Read or Die
Read or Die (Manga)
Ring ni Kakero 2
Sand Land
The Summit of the Gods
Time Stranger Kyoko
Yu-Gi-Oh! Official Card Game Duel Monsters Official Rule Guide — The Thousand Rule Bible

2001
Addicted to Curry
Akatsuki! Otokojuku: Seinen yo, Daishi wo Idake
Bleach
Captain Tsubasa: Road to 2002
Claymore
ComaGoma
Diabolo
Dragon Drive
Gun Blaze West
Kinnikuman Nisei: All Chōjin Dai-Shingeki
Le Bizzarre Avventure di GioGio II: Golden Heart/Golden Ring
Skyhigh
Ultra Maniac
Violence Jack: Sengoku Majinden

2002
Aishiteruze Baby
Beet the Vandel Buster
Captain Tsubasa Final Countdown
Elfen Lied
Eyeshield 21
Hells Angels
Saint Seiya – Gigantomachia
Strawberry 100%
Tail of the Moon
Tokimeki Midnight
Yu-Gi-Oh! Character Guidebook: The Gospel of Truth
Zetman

2003
Buso Renkin
Cactus's Secret
Crimson Hero
Death Note
Gin Tama
Ginban Kaleidoscope
High School Debut
Read or Dream
Real World
Skyhigh: Karma
Skyhigh: Shinshō
St. ♥ Dragon Girl Miracle
Tenkamusou Edajima Heihachi Den
Tough

2004
All You Need Is Kill
B Gata H Kei
B.O.D.Y.
Bartender
Captain Tsubasa FCRB
Captain Tsubasa Golden Dream
D.Gray-man
Denpa teki na Kanojo
Funbari Poem
Girl Friend
Higepiyo
JoJo's Bizarre Adventure Part 7: Steel Ball Run
Kinnikuman Nisei: Kyūkyoku no Chōjin Tag Hen
Reborn!
Oton
Rosario + Vampire
The Earl and the Fairy
The Gentlemen's Alliance Cross
Wāqwāq
Yu-Gi-Oh! R

2005
Abara
Captain Tsubasa: Golden-23
Gimmick!
Tatakau Shisho
Yasuko to Kenji
Yu-Gi-Oh! GX

2006
81diver
Biomega
Captain Tsubasa Japan Dream
Ral Ω Grad
Switch Girl!!
Tegami Bachi
To Love Ru
Usogui

2007
A Devil and Her Love Song
Akikan!
Crash!
Dr. Mashirito - Abale-chan
Dreamin' Sun
Chocolate Cosmos
Dragonaut: The Resonance
Embalming
First Love Limited
Katekyō Hitman Reborn! Official Character Book Vongola 77
Katekyō Hitman Reborn! Sōshūhen: Vongola Family
Katekyō Hitman Reborn!: Hidden Bullet
Psyren
Reibaishi Izuna
Reinōryokusha Odagiri Kyōko no Uso
Rosario + Vampire: Season II
Run with the Wind
Shiki
Sket Dance
Stepping on Roses
Strobe Edge
The Book: JoJo's Bizarre Adventure 4th Another Day

2008
Akikan! (Manga)
Aozora Yell
Bakuman
Ben-To
Campione!
Demon Love Spell
Genkaku Picasso
Gingitsune
Good Luck Girl!
Hayate × Blade
Karakuri Dôji Ultimo Chapter: 0
Kinnikuman Lady
Rosario + Vampire (Novel)
Rozen Maiden (Weekly Young Jump)
Rozen Maiden Shinsōban
Sakura Hime: The Legend of Princess Sakura
Stardust Wink
Tatakau Shisho to Koisuru Bakudan
Toriko
Yumeiro Patissiere
Zekkyō Gakkyū

2009
Anedoki
Beelzebub
Berry Dynamite
Blood Blockade Battlefront
Blue Exorcist
Captain Tsubasa In Calcio
Captain Tsubasa Kaigai Gekito Hen
Element Hunters
Gokujyo
Peach-Pit Art book (Rozen Maiden)
Sing "Yesterday" for Me EX: Visiting the Origin, Kei Toume Early Short Stories
SKET DANCE extra dance
Ultimo
De-I-Ko! GX
Yu-Gi-Oh! 5D's

2010s

2010
Anyamaru Tantei Kiruminzuu
Blue Friend
Captain Tsubasa En La Liga
Captain Tsubasa Live Together
Enigma (manga)
Enma vs: Dororon Enma-kun Gaiden
Gourmet Academy Toriko
Heroine Shikkaku
Hibi Rock
Psyren: Another Call
Reborn Colore!
To Love Ru Darkness
Yu-Gi-Oh! 10th Anniversary Animation Book
Yu-Gi-Oh! Zexal

2011
87 Clockers
Amai Seikatsu 2nd Season
Ao Haru Ride
Ao Haru Ride (Novel)
Blank Canvas: My So-Called Artist's Journey
ChocoTan!
Cyclops Shōjo Saipu
Daytime Shooting Star
Dragon Ball: Episode of Bardock
Duel Art
Gate 7
Hito Hitori Futari
JoJo's Bizarre Adventure Over Heaven
JoJo's Bizarre Adventure Part 8: JoJolion
Prophecy
Purple Haze Feedback
Reibaishi Izuna: Ascension
Rokka: Braves of the Six Flowers
Shaman King: Zero
Sugar Soldier
Supinamarada!
Taste of the Devil Fruit!!
Terra Formars
Tiger & Bunny
Tokyo Ghoul
Winners Circle e Yōkoso
Wolf Girl and Black Prince

2012
Anohana: The Flower We Saw That Day
Assassination Classroom
Barrage
Beast Saga
Brynhildr in the Darkness
Chōsoku Henkei Gyrozetter 
Cross Manage
Food Wars!: Shokugeki no Soma
Haikyu!!
Jorge Joestar
Like a Butterfly
Oedo Honey
R.O.D Rehabilitation
Rainbow Days
Robotics;Notes Revival Legacy
Rokka: Braves of the Six Flowers (Manga)
Romantica Clock
Maite wa Ikenai Rozen Maiden
Rozen Maiden Dolls Talk
Rurouni Kenshin: Restoration
Senyu
Seraph of the End
Shaman King: Flowers
Shinmai Fukei Kiruko-san
Smoking Gun - Minkan Kasōken Chōsa'in Nagareda Midori
Tanken Driland
The Disastrous Life of Saiki K.
Yu-Gi-Oh! D-Team Zexal
Z/X Zillions of enemy X

2013
Boku Girl
Captain Tsubasa: Rising Sun
Dame na Watashi ni Koishite Kudasai
Dragon Ball: A Visual History
ēlDLIVE
Gaist Crusher
Gunjō Senki
Hamatora
Himouto! Umaru-chan
JoJoveller
ReRe Hello
Rozen Maiden Comic & Anime Official Guide Book
Scorching Ping Pong Girls
Tokyo Ghoul [Jack]
Tokyo Ghoul: Days
Tsubasa to Hotaru
Twin Star Exorcists
World Trigger

2014
7thGarden
All You Need Is Kill (manga)
Bungo
Clean Freak! Aoyama-kun
Golden Kamuy
Hatena Illusion
Hinomaru Sumo
Oshiete! Michelle Kyōkan
Rozen Maiden Art Book: Rose Maiden
Rurouni Kenshin: Master of Flame
School Judgment: Gakkyu Hotei
selector infected WIXOSS -peeping analyze-
selector infected WIXOSS: Maya no Oheya
Serapetit!〜Seraph of the End four-frame manga〜
Shirokuma Cafe Today's Special
Steins;Gate: Aishin Meizu no Babel
Terra for Police
Terra Formars Gaiden Rain Hard
Terra Formars wa Oyasumi Desu.
The Last: Naruto the Movie
Tokyo Ghoul Zakki
Tokyo Ghoul: Past
Tokyo Ghoul: Void
Tokyo Ghoul:re
Tonkatsu DJ Agetarō
Yokai Girls
Yokokuhan: The Copycat

2015
2.43: Seiin Kōkō Danshi Volley-bu
Ashitaba-san Chi no Mukogurashi
Black Clover
Boys Over Flowers Season 2
Chronos Ruler
Dragon Ball Super
Dragon Ball Z: Resurrection 'F'
Ex-Arm
Gantz G
Hero Classroom
Rifle is Beautiful
RWBY
Ryū wo Tsugu Otoko
Straighten Up! Welcome to Shika High's Competitive Dance Club
Taisho Otome Fairy Tale
Terra Formars Gaiden Asimov
Terra Formars Gaiden Keiji Onizuka
Ultramarine Magmell
Ulysses: Jeanne d'Arc and the Alchemist Knight
Yokokuhan: The Chaser
Yu-Gi-Oh! Arc-V
Yu-Gi-Oh! Arc-V: Saikyō Duelist Yuya

2016
Ace Attorney
Aharen-san wa Hakarenai
Akebi's Sailor Uniform
Akira Toriyama: Dragon Quest Illustrations
Akuma no Memumemu-chan
Astra Lost in Space
Black Tiger
Black Torch
Boruto: Naruto Next Generations
Demon Slayer: Kimetsu no Yaiba
Fire Punch
Jumyō o Kaitotte Moratta. Ichinen ni Tsuki, Ichimanen de
Rozen Maiden 0 -Zero-
Rurouni Kenshin Side Story: The Ex-Con Ashitaro
Space Patrol Luluco
Sundome!! Milky Way
Terraho-kun
The Promised Neverland
Tokyo Ghoul:re: quest
World's End Harem
Yuizaki-san wa Nageru!
Yuuna and the Haunted Hot Springs

2017
Assassins Pride
Blue Flag
Dr. Stone
Ichigo 100% East Side Story
Mone-san no Majimesugiru Tsukiaikata
Play Ball 2
Rurouni Kenshin: The Hokkaido Arc
RWBY: Official Manga Anthology
Sōusei no Onmyōji: SD Nyoritsuryō!!
Summer Time Rendering
Super HxEros
We Never Learn
Z/X Code reunion

2018
2.43: Seiin Kōkō Danshi Volley-bu (manga)
Act-Age
Bōkyaku Battery
Burn the Witch (One-shot)
Chainsaw Man
Darling in the Franxx
Darling in the Franxx!
Double Decker! Doug & Kirill
Hell's Paradise: Jigokuraku
Oyakusoku no Neverland
Raven of the Inner Palace
Robot × LaserBeam
RWBY: The Official Manga
Shadows House
Shōwa Otome Otogibanashi
Soloist in a Cage
Sōsei no Onmyōji: Tenen Jakko: Nishoku Kokkeiga
Strike or Gutter
Teenage Renaissance! David
The Birds of Death
Ulysses: Jeanne d'Arc to Hyakunen Sensō no Himitsu
World's End Harem: Fantasia
Yakusoku no Neverland: Norman kara no Tegami

2019
The 100 Girlfriends Who Really, Really, Really, Really, Really Love You
Agravity Boys
Bokutachi wa Benkyō ga Dekinai hi Nichijō no Reidai-shū
Bokutachi wa Benkyō ga Dekinai: Mitaiken no Jikanwari
Samurai 8: The Tale of Hachimaru
Shin Sakura Taisen: The Comic
Spy × Family
SSSS.Gridman
Tis Time for Torture, Princess
Wicked Trapper
Yakusoku no Neverland: Mama-tachi no Tsuisōkyoku
Yui Kamio Lets Loose

2020s

2020
Ayakashi Triangle
BNA ZERO Massara ni Narenai Kemono-tachi
BNA: Brand New Animal
Build King
Burn the Witch
Excuse Me Dentist, It's Touching Me!
Gantz:E
Ghost Reaper Girl
Guardian of the Witch
Hard-Boiled Cop and Dolphin
High School Family
Moriking
Ron Kamonohashi
Sakamoto Days
Shōnen no Abyss
Sing "Yesterday" for Me afterword
Sundome!! Milky Way Another End
Time Paradox Ghostwriter
Uma Musume Cinderella Gray
Undead Unluck
World's End Harem: Britannia Lumiére
World's End Harem: Fantasia Academy
Yu-Gi-Oh! SEVENS Luke! Explosive Supremacy Legend!!
Yu-Gi-Oh! Sevens: Boku no Road Gakuen

2021
Ayashimon
Blue Box
Choujin X
Dandadan
Doron Dororon
DRCL midnight children
Fujiko no Kimyō na Shoseijutsu: Whitesnake no Gosan
Taisho Otome Otogi Banashi: Enseika no Shokutaku
The Elusive Samurai
The Hunters Guild: Red Hood
Tokimeki Tonight Sorekara
Usogui: Tokubetsu-hen
Witch Watch
Zombie Land Saga Gaiden: The First Zombie

Unsorted
The 100th Love with You
Captain Tsubasa: All Star Game
Rickshaw Man

See also
List of manga published by Shogakukan
List of manga published by Hakusensha

References

Shueisha
Lists of comics by publisher